The Kasapi Union of Filipino Migrant Workers in Greece (Greek: Kasapi Hellas) is a Greek trade union founded in 1986. It advocates for worker's rights and provide social support to Filipino migrants in Greece.

History 

Kasapi Union was founded in 1986 by Deborah Carlos Valencia, her husband Joe Valencia, and other Filipino refugees to Greece, who had fled Ferdinand Marcos. During the 1980s, Kasapi Union launched a political advocacy campaign to increase rights for second-generation Filipinos in Greece. The same decade it launched a campaign to include domestic workers in the International Labour Organization's Convention on Domestic Workers, achieving success in 2011. 

In 1998, the organisation held a worker's solidarity event at Panteion University. In the mid-1990s the union launched a campaign to enable migrants workers to become legal workers.

Activities and membership 
The organisation provides social support to people who became unemployed, runs childcare, provides low-interest loans and support Filipino immigrants access legal services. With the Melissa Network, Kasapi provides support to traveling unaccompanied refugee children traveling to Greece.

The organisation is one of the oldest Filipino associations in Greece. By 2019, it had around 15,000 to 20,000 members, mostly based in Athens, mostly women. The union's members, many of whom were fled the rule of Filipino dictator Ferdinand Marcos, are commonly politically active.

See also 

 Greek Council of Refugees

 Immigration to Greece

References

External links 

 Official website

1986 establishments in Greece
Trade unions in Greece
Organizations based in Athens
Domestic workers' unions
Trade unions established in 1986